Ahangar Mahalleh (also Romanized as Āhangar Maḩalleh) is a village in Estarabad-e Jonubi Rural District, in the Central District of Gorgan County, Golestan Province, Iran. At the 2006 census, its population was 1,997, in 525 families.

References 

Populated places in Gorgan County